Events from the year 1954 in Canada.

Incumbents

Crown
 Monarch – Elizabeth II

Federal government
 Governor General – Vincent Massey
 Prime Minister – Louis St. Laurent
 Chief Justice – Thibaudeau Rinfret (Quebec) (until 22 June) then Patrick Kerwin (Ontario)
 Parliament – 22nd

Provincial governments

Lieutenant governors
Lieutenant Governor of Alberta – John J. Bowlen
Lieutenant Governor of British Columbia – Clarence Wallace
Lieutenant Governor of Manitoba – John Stewart McDiarmid
Lieutenant Governor of New Brunswick – David Laurence MacLaren
Lieutenant Governor of Newfoundland – Leonard Outerbridge
Lieutenant Governor of Nova Scotia – Alistair Fraser
Lieutenant Governor of Ontario – Louis Orville Breithaupt
Lieutenant Governor of Prince Edward Island – Thomas William Lemuel Prowse
Lieutenant Governor of Quebec – Gaspard Fauteux
Lieutenant Governor of Saskatchewan – William John Patterson

Premiers
Premier of Alberta – Ernest Manning
Premier of British Columbia – W.A.C. Bennett
Premier of Manitoba – Douglas Campbell
Premier of New Brunswick – Hugh John Flemming
Premier of Newfoundland – Joey Smallwood
Premier of Nova Scotia – Angus Macdonald (until April 13) then Harold Connolly (April 13 to September 30) then Henry Hicks
Premier of Ontario – Leslie Frost
Premier of Prince Edward Island – Alex Matheson
Premier of Quebec – Maurice Duplessis
Premier of Saskatchewan – Tommy Douglas

Territorial governments

Commissioners
 Commissioner of Yukon – Wilfred George Brown
 Commissioner of Northwest Territories – Robert Gordon Robertson

Events
January 1 – Metropolitan Toronto comes into being to coordinate services among the various municipalities around Toronto.
January 8 – The first oil from Alberta arrives in Sarnia through the new pipeline
March 30 – The Yonge St. subway, the first subway system in Canada, opens in Toronto
April 13 – Angus Lewis Macdonald, Premier of Nova Scotia, dies in office
April 14 – Harold Connolly becomes premier of Nova Scotia
May 31 – Winnipeg's first television station, CBWT a CBC Television owned and operated station, begins broadcasting
August 10 – The groundbreaking ceremony for the St. Lawrence Seaway begins
September 9 - The 1954 Series of banknotes is introduced.
September 9 – Marilyn Bell becomes the first person to swim Lake Ontario
September 18 – Marie-Victorin Statue unveiled
September 30 – Henry Hicks becomes premier of Nova Scotia, replacing Harold Connolly
October 15 – Hurricane Hazel hits Toronto killing 81.

Full date unknown
Canada contributes to a peacekeeping force in Indochina
Sir Adam Beck Generating Station built on the Canadian side of the Niagara River
Pinetree Line radar system completed
Yahtzee is invented by a Canadian couple
Jean Drapeau first elected mayor of Montreal
Streetcars leave Winnipeg

Arts and literature

New books
Mordecai Richler – The Acrobats
Gabrielle Roy – Alexandre Chenevert
Igor Gouzenko – The Fall of a Titan

Awards
See 1954 Governor General's Awards for a complete list of winners and finalists for those awards.
Stephen Leacock Award: Joan Walker, Pardon My Parka

Sport
April 16 - The Detroit Red Wings win their sixth Stanley Cup by defeating the  Montreal Canadiens 4 games to 3.
May 16 - The Ontario Hockey Association's St. Catharines Teepees win their first Memorial Cup by defeating the Central Alberta Hockey League's Edmonton Oil Kings 4 games to 0 (with 1 tie). All games were played at Maple Leaf Gardens in Toronto
July 30 – The Miracle Mile is run at the British Empire and Commonwealth Games in Vancouver. Empire Stadium is opened on the same day.
August 28 - The BC Lions are established. This event is often seen as the beginning of the Canadian Football League despite the league being established three years later
November 27 - The Edmonton Eskimos win their first Grey Cup by defeating the Montreal Alouettes 26 to 25 in the 42nd Grey Cup played at Varsity Stadium in Toronto

Births

January to June
January 11 – Jim Wych, snooker player and sports announcer
January 29 – Doug Risebrough, ice hockey player and coach
February 3 – Tiger Williams, ice hockey player
February 24 – Sid Meier, Canadian-American programmer
March 2 – Ed Johnstone, ice hockey player
March 4 – Catherine O'Hara, actress
April 5 - Claude-André Lachance, politician and son of Georges-C. Lachance
April 7 – Clark Gillies, ice hockey player (d. 2022)
April 17 – Roddy Piper, wrestler and actor (d. 2015)
April 20 – Gilles Lupien, ice hockey player and agent (d. 2021)
May 4 – Sylvia Burka, ice speed skater and World Champion, cyclist
May 10 – Eleni Bakopanos, politician
May 13 – David Bissett, field hockey player
May 14 – Danny Gare, ice hockey player
May 16 – Dafydd Williams, physician and astronaut
May 26 – Aritha Van Herk, writer, critic, editor and university professor
May 28 – John Tory, businessman, politician and broadcaster
June 3 – Wally Weir, Canadian ice hockey player
June 28 – Jean-Serge Brisson, politician

July to December
July 6 – Brian Pallister, politician
July 9 – Kevin O'Leary, businessman, television personality, and political candidate
July 18 – Audrey Vandervelden, volleyball player
August 11 – Gulzar Singh Cheema, politician

August 16 – James Cameron, film director, producer and screenwriter
September 3 – Avis Gray, politician
October 21 – Brian Tobin, politician
November 7 – Guy Gavriel Kay, fantasy fiction author
November 12 – Dave Edge, long-distance runner
November 24 – Stuart Murray, politician
December 14 – Steven MacLean, astronaut
December 20 – John Kinch, football player (d. 2022)
December 28 – Lanny Poffo, wrestler (d. 2023)

Full date unknown
Alan Kane, author
Jim St. James, actor and HIV/AIDS activist

Deaths
January 24 – H. H. Wrong, diplomat (b. 1894)
February 13 – Agnes Macphail, politician, first woman to be elected to the House of Commons of Canada (b. 1890)
March 31 – John Walter Jones, politician and Premier of Prince Edward Island (b. 1878)
April 4 – Abraham Albert Heaps, politician and labor leader (b. 1885)
April 8 – Winnifred Eaton, author (b. 1875)
April 13 – Angus Lewis Macdonald, lawyer, law professor, politician and 19th Premier of Nova Scotia (b. 1890)
June 18 – Welland Gemmell, politician and Minister
August 6 – Emilie Dionne, one of the Dionne Quintuplets (b. 1934)
November 26 – Wallace Rupert Turnbull, engineer and inventor (b. 1870)

Full date unknown
James Endicott, church leader and missionary (b. 1865)

See also
 List of Canadian films

References

 
Years of the 20th century in Canada
Canada
1954 in North America